"Better Get a Lawyer" is a song by Australian indie rock band The Cruel Sea. The song was released in November 1994 as the lead single from the band's fourth studio album, Three Legged Dog. The song peaked at number 29 on the ARIA Charts.

The track borrows lyrics heavily from Jon Wayne's "Texas Jailcell" giving Jon Wayne a songwriter credit.

"Better Get a Lawyer" was polled a number 14 in the Triple J Hottest 100, 1994; the fifth highest placing by an Australian artist.

The CD Single contained an unlisted song after the final track that contains a spoken-word piece containing lyrics concerning the 70s TV show Charlie's Angels.

Video
The black and white music video depicts Perkins being arrested and the band being placed in a cell. Part of the intended video was censored. Gormly said, "What they didn't like was the expression on Tex's face when he was put in a headlock, so we had to put that blurred effect on his face. The thing is, you've got to do what they say because you've spent $20,000 on a film clip, which will just be a big egg if it isn't played."

Track listing
 "Better Get a Lawyer" - 3:02
 "Looks Like It's Gonna Rain" - 2:07
 "Manic Depression" - 2:44
 "5,000 Dead Lawyers" - 5:53

Charts

References

The Cruel Sea (band) songs
1994 songs
1994 singles